Swings Both Ways Live (also known as The Swing Tour Live) was the tenth concert tour by British recording artist, Robbie Williams. The tour supports his tenth studio album, Swings Both Ways. Beginning April 2014, the tour played 50 shows in Europe, Australia and Asia.

Setlist
The following setlist is obtained from the concert of 25 April 2014 at the Budapest Sports Arena in Budapest, Hungary. It does not represents all concerts during the tour.
"Shine My Shoes"
"Puttin' On the Ritz"
"Ain't That a Kick in the Head?"
"Minnie the Moocher"
"Swing Supreme" 
"No One Likes a Fat Pop Star"
"That's Amore"
"Mr. Bojangles"
"I Wan'na Be Like You" 
"High Hopes"
"Swings Both Ways"
"Soda Pop" 
"Fever"
"If I Only Had a Brain"
"Go Gentle"
"Do Nothing till You Hear from Me"
"Theme from New York"
"Angels"
"Sensational"

Notes
"I Will Talk and Hollywood Will Listen" was performed in lieu of "If I Only Had a Brain" for shows in Northern Ireland, the United Kingdom, Australia and Berlin (Germany)

Tour dates

Festivals and other miscellaneous performances
Top of the Mountain Concert
Rock in Rio Lisboa
2014 Formula 1 Singapore Airlines Singapore Grand Prix

Box office score data

References

External links
Robbie Williams Official Website

2014 concert tours
Robbie Williams concert tours